The 2005 WNBA season was the ninth for the New York Liberty. The Liberty advanced to the playoffs, but they were quickly swept by the Indiana Fever in the Conference Semifinals.

Offseason

WNBA Draft

Regular season

Season standings

Season schedule

Playoffs

Player stats

References

External links
Liberty on Basketball Reference

New York Liberty seasons
New York
New York Liberty